Albert Ramazanovich Saritov (born July 8, 1985 in Khasavyurt) is a Russian-born Naturalized Romanian freestyle wrestler of Chechen descent. 2016 Olympics bronze medalist, bronze medalist World Wrestling Championships 2011 in Istanbul, Turkey. Ramzan Kadyrov & Adlan Varayev cup 2012 winner, Golden Grand Prix Ivan Yarygin 2011 runner-up and winner Ali Aliyev Memorial 2014. He is representing Mindiashvili wrestling academy.

In March 2021, he competed at the European Qualification Tournament in Budapest, Hungary and qualified for the 2020 Summer Olympics in Tokyo, Japan.

Personal life
Saritov is a Muslim.

References

External links
 wrestrus.ru
 

Living people
1985 births
Romanian male sport wrestlers
Romanian Muslims
Russian male sport wrestlers
Olympic wrestlers of Romania
People from Khasavyurt
Chechen martial artists
Romanian people of Russian descent
Russian people of Chechen descent
Chechen people
World Wrestling Championships medalists
Olympic bronze medalists for Romania
Olympic medalists in wrestling
Wrestlers at the 2016 Summer Olympics
Medalists at the 2016 Summer Olympics
European Wrestling Championships medalists
Wrestlers at the 2020 Summer Olympics
Sportspeople from Dagestan